Pleocoma australis, the southern rain beetle, is a species of rain beetle in the family Pleocomidae. It is found in North America.

References

Further reading

 

scarabaeiformia
Articles created by Qbugbot
Beetles described in 1911